Boundary Islet, historically known as North East Islet, is a  islet in the Hogan Island Group of Bass Strait, at a latitude of 39°12′ S, about  east of the southernmost point of mainland Victoria. The islet straddles the maritime border of the Australian states of Victoria and Tasmania, hence the name.

Tasmania–Victoria land border
Boundary Islet is divided in the east–west direction at the latitude 39°12′ S, with the northern portion belonging to Victoria and the southern portion belonging to Tasmania.

This situation is accidental, and arose as a result of an error made by Captain John Black, who surveyed the position of the islet in 1801 and determined its latitude to be slightly further north than it truly is. The boundary between Victoria and Tasmania was later set along the latitude of 39°12′ S, which was then thought to be completely south of Boundary Islet and not to traverse any land in Bass Strait. This would have made the islet completely within the jurisdiction of Victoria. However, when Boundary Islet's correct latitude was later determined it was found to straddle the border. It is for this reason that what was once known as North East Islet (being situated in the north-east of the Hogan Group) came to be known as Boundary Islet.

See also

 List of islands of Australia
 List of islands of Tasmania

References

Islands of Victoria (Australia)
Islands of Northern Tasmania
Islands of Bass Strait
Borders of Tasmania
Borders of Victoria (Australia)
Hogan Group
Divided regions